The Department of Finance and Administration (also called DOFA) was an Australian government department tasked to contribute to sustainable Government finances; improved and more efficient Government operations; and efficiently functioning Parliament. The Department existed between October 1997 and December 2007, operating under the Howard Government.

Outcomes and scope
The Department contributed to three key outcomes: sustainable Government finances; improved and more efficient Government operations; and efficiently functioning Parliament.

Information about the department's functions and/or government funding allocation could be found in the Administrative Arrangements Orders, the annual Portfolio Budget Statements, in the department's annual reports and on the department's website.

At its creation, the Department dealt with:
Evaluation and review of government programs and associated expenditure and staffing proposals
Expenditure and staffing estimates
Government financial administration and accounts, including administration of the Public Account 
Commission of Audit
Commonwealth superannuation schemes
General policy guidelines for Commonwealth statutory authorities, Commonwealth companies and government business enterprises and monitoring the financial performance of government business enterprises
Oversight of Commonwealth public sector financial management policy development
Conduct of major asset sales
In relation to natural disaster relief arrangements, financial assistance to the States, the Australian Capital Territory and the Northern Territory
Acquisition, leasing, management and disposal of land and property in Australia and overseas
Transport and storage services
Co-ordination of purchasing policy and civil purchasing
Disposal of goods
Planning, execution and maintenance of Commonwealth Government works
Design and maintenance of Government furniture, furnishings and fittings
Government printing and publishing services
Electoral matters
Provision of facilities for Members of Parliament other than in Parliament House
Administrative support for Royal Commissions and certain other inquiries
Information co-ordination and services within Australia, including advertising

Structure
The Department was an Australian Public Service department, staffed by officials responsible to the Minister for Finance and Administration, initially John Fahey (until November 2001) and then Nick Minchin.

Notes

References and further reading

Australia, Finance and Administration
Finance and Administration